Megan Elizabeth Barker (born 15 August 1997) is a Welsh professional racing cyclist, who currently rides for UCI Women's Continental Team . She represented Wales at the 2018 Commonwealth Games. Her elder sister, Elinor Barker, is also a professional cyclist.

References

External links
 
British Cycling

1997 births
Living people
Welsh female cyclists
Welsh track cyclists
Cyclists at the 2018 Commonwealth Games
Place of birth missing (living people)
European Games medalists in cycling
European Games gold medalists for Great Britain
European Games silver medalists for Great Britain
Cyclists at the 2019 European Games
Commonwealth Games competitors for Wales
Cyclists at the 2022 Commonwealth Games